Franz Friedrich Fronius  (1829–1886) was a Transylvanian-Saxon botanist, ethnologist, and Lutheran cleric from Schäßburg.

Fronius was born on 9 January 1829, in Nadesch (now Nadeş). He authored over thirty books, including, Flora von Schäßburg, ein Beitrag zur Flora von Siebenbürgen (English: Flora of Schäßburg, a Contribution to the Flora of Siebenbürgen), and Aus Siebenbürgens Vorzeit und Gegenwart: Mittheilungen (English: "Releases: Transylvania, from Antiquity to Present"). He also co-authored many other works.

Fronius died on 14 February 1886, in Agnetheln (now Agnita).

References

Transylvanian Saxon people
Romanian botanists
Romanian Lutheran clergy
1829 births
1886 deaths